The 1926 Major League Baseball season was contested from April 13 to October 10, 1926. The St. Louis Cardinals and New York Yankees were the regular season champions of the National League and American League, respectively. The Cardinals then defeated the Yankees in the World Series, four games to three.

This was the fifth of eight seasons that "League Awards", a precursor to the Major League Baseball Most Valuable Player Award (introduced in 1931), were issued.

Awards and honors
League Award
George Burns, Cleveland Indians, 1B
Bob O'Farrell, St. Louis Cardinals, C

Statistical leaders

Standings

American League

National League

Postseason

Bracket

Managers

American League

National League

Home Field Attendance

Notable events
August 26 - Dutch Levsen of the Cleveland Indians becomes the last pitcher to win both games of a doubleheader, hurling two 9 inning games back to back, winning 6-1 and 5-1. Levsen is also the last pitcher to throw two nine-inning complete games on the same day.

References

External links
1926 Major League Baseball season schedule at Baseball Reference

 
Major League Baseball seasons